Robert Tomasz Mazurek (born 17 September 1971) is a Polish journalist, columnist and traveler.

Education 
He is a graduate of journalism at the University of Warsaw, where he also conducts classes with students.

Career

Journalistic career 
From the beginning of the 1990s, he published his reports and essays on journeys, especially in the countries of the former Soviet Union, the Balkans, the Middle East and Africa, in the pages of Nowe Państwo, Tygodnik Powszechny, Rzeczpospolita and Dziennik. Since 2010, his travel columns have been published by the monthly Poznaj Świat. He was the deputy editor-in-chief of the monthly Film, a journalist for Życie and Wprost. In the years 2006–2009 he published columns and weekly interviews Rozmowa Mazurka in Dziennik. In September 2009 he transferred them to Rzeczpospolita (Wywiady Mazurka appeared in the weekend Plus Minus until December 2016). He started as one of the founders of the quarterly Fronda.

He wrote journalistic texts and historical reports in the weekly magazine Nowe Państwo. As the first Polish journalist interviewed the Stalinist judge Stefan Michnik, who lived in Sweden, and Kazimierz Mijal.

Together with Igor Zalewski, in April 1998, he created a satirical column Z życia koalicji, z życia opozycji in the weekly Nowe Państwo, which was an overview of the political events of the week in the form of short, sarcastic and ironic notes. The authors provide information obtained by themselves, political rumors and comment on commonly known facts. The authors also introduced several well-known concepts into the public language, incl. the Belarusian Television branch in Warsaw (for TVP during the presidency of Robert Kwiatkowski), Brunatny Robert (about Robert Kwiatkowski), the most famous Polish mulatto (about Andrzej Lepper). It was in this section that the Rywin affair was first described.

It gained the greatest popularity in the weekly Wprost, where it was published in the years 2002–2010, and then it was published (from June 2010) in Fakt. In the years 2011–2012, the column was published in the weekly Uważam Rze, and from December 2012 to June 2018 in the weekly Sieci. The portal wPolityce.pl, related to the weekly "W Sieci", publishes his columns in the series Pół porcji mazurka.

Since 2011, he has been publishing columns on wines in the weekly magazine Uważam Rze, and since 2013 in the weekly Sieci. Since February 2017, he has been publishing interviews in the weekend issue of Dziennik Gazeta Prawna. Since October 2018, he has been publishing columns Wina Mazurka and Mazurek na wynos in "Plus Minus", the weekend supplement of the Rzeczpospolita daily.

In 2010, he was awarded the Golden Fish for the best columnists.

In 2021, as part of a happening, together with Krzysztof Stanowski, he published a book of poems entitled "Kmioty Polskie", the income from which was donated to charity.

Radio and television career 
In 2005, together with Igor Zalewski, he hosted the program Lekka jazda Mazurka i Zalewskiego in TVP1. In 2016, he was one of the hosts of the morning edition of the program #dziejesienazywo broadcast on Wirtualna Polska. Since September 2016 he has been running the program Poranna Rozmowa in RMF FM. Since July 2020, he has been running the Mazurek słucha program on Polskie Radio Program II. He conducts talks with famous people from the world of media, culture and art about their favorite music. From September 2021, he co-hosts the journalistic program Mazurek & Stanowski with Krzysztof Stanowski in the Kanał Sportowy on YouTube.

References 

1971 births
Living people
Polish television journalists
Polish radio journalists
Polish YouTubers
People from Lidzbark Warmiński
University of Warsaw alumni